John Dobbie (1914-2005) was an Australian international lawn bowler.

Bowls career
Dobbie started bowling in 1934 for the Glenferrie Hill Bowls Club. He competed in the first World Bowls Championship in Kyeemagh, New South Wales, Australia in 1966  and won a gold medal in the triples with Don Collins and Athol Johnston and a silver in the fours. He also won a gold medal in the team event (Leonard Trophy).

He was club champion 11 times of which his first win in 1947 was against his father in the final.

Family
His father was Frank Dobbie who won the 1927 & 1931 singles titles at the Australian National Bowls Championships when bowling for the City of Camberwell Bowls Club.

He died in 2005.

References

1914 births
2005 deaths
Australian male bowls players
Bowls World Champions
Sport Australia Hall of Fame inductees
20th-century Australian people